In enzymology, a rubber cis-polyprenylcistransferase is an enzyme that catalyzes the chemical reaction

poly-cis-polyprenyl diphosphate + isopentenyl diphosphate  diphosphate + a poly-cis-polyprenyl diphosphate longer by one C5 unit

Thus, the two substrates of this enzyme are poly-cis-polyprenyl diphosphate and isopentenyl diphosphate, whereas its two products are diphosphate and poly-cis-polyprenyl diphosphate longer by one C5 unit.

This enzyme belongs to the family of transferases, specifically those transferring aryl or alkyl groups other than methyl groups.  The systematic name of this enzyme class is poly-cis-polyprenyl-diphosphate:isopentenyl-diphosphate polyprenylcistransferase. Other names in common use include rubber allyltransferase, rubber transferase, isopentenyl pyrophosphate cis-1,4-polyisoprenyl transferase, cis-prenyl transferase, rubber polymerase, and rubber prenyltransferase.  This enzyme participates in biosynthesis of steroids.

References 

 
 

EC 2.5.1
Enzymes of unknown structure